Halina Tam Siu-Wan, also known as May (born 6 September 1972) is a model, singer and actress. She is best known for her role in Legend of the Demigods and The Gentle Crackdown with co-star Wayne Lai.

Career
Tam was the winner of the Miss Hong Kong Pageant 1994. She went on to represent Hong Kong at the Miss Chinese International 1995 pageant where she placed in the top 5, resulting in a berth at Miss Universe 1995 where she placed 45th. She had a singing career with BMG (Hong Kong) in 1997 and worked as an actress with TVB in Hong Kong. She also hosted Leisure and Pleasure from 2008 to 2010 and co-hosted Destiny and Beyond for the network. She left TVB after 18 years of working for the network, having last appeared on screen in 2012.

Personal life
Halina married her boyfriend Eric Choi on 11 September 2007. She opened her first craft supplies store in 2013 and continued with a small snack shop in Causeway Bay in March 2014.

Filmography

Films
Young and Dangerous 2 (1996)
Young and Dangerous 3 (1996)
Troublesome Night 8 (2000)
Troublesome Night 9 (2001)
Troublesome Night 11 (2001)
Dance of a Dream (2001)

Albums
自主 (1997)
被爱 (1997)
最差情人 (1998)

References

External links
 
 

Hong Kong television actresses
TVB veteran actors
1972 births
Living people
Miss Hong Kong winners
Hong Kong female models
20th-century Hong Kong women singers
Hong Kong film actresses
20th-century Hong Kong actresses
21st-century Hong Kong actresses